"The Manifesto of the Italian Fasces of Combat", commonly known as the Fascist Manifesto, was the initial declaration of the political stance of the Fasci Italiani di Combattimento ("Italian Fasces of Combat") the movement founded in Milan by Benito Mussolini in 1919 and an early exponent of Fascism. The Manifesto was authored by national syndicalist Alceste De Ambris and the futurist poet Filippo Marinetti.

Contents of the Fascist Manifesto 
The Manifesto (published in Il Popolo d'Italia on June 6, 1919) is divided into four sections, describing the movement's objectives in political, social, military and financial fields.

Politically, the Manifesto calls for:
 Universal suffrage with a lowered voting age to 18 years, and voting and electoral office eligibility for all ages 25 and up;
 Proportional representation on a regional basis;
 Voting for women;
 Representation at government level of newly created national councils by economic sector;
 The abolition of the Italian Senate (at the time, the Senate, as the upper house of parliament, was by process elected by the wealthier citizens, but were in reality direct appointments by the king. It has been described as a sort of extended council of the crown);
 The formation of a national council of experts for labor, for industry, for transportation, for the public health, for communications, etc. Selections to be made of professionals or of tradesmen with legislative powers, and elected directly to a general commission with ministerial powers.

In labor and social policy, the Manifesto calls for:
 The quick enactment of a law of the state that sanctions an eight-hour workday for all workers;
 A minimum wage;
 The participation of workers' representatives in the functions of industry commissions;
 To show the same confidence in the labor unions (that prove to be technically and morally worthy) as is given to industry executives or public servants;
 Reorganization of the railways and the public transport sector;
 Revision of the draft law on invalidity insurance;
 Reduction of the retirement age from 65 to 55.

In military affairs, the Manifesto advocates:
 Creation of a short-service national militia with specifically defensive responsibilities;
 Armaments factories are to be nationalized;
 A peaceful but competitive foreign policy.

In finance, the Manifesto advocates:
 A strong extraordinary tax on capital of a progressive nature, which takes the form of true partial expropriation of all wealth;
 The seizure of all the possessions of the religious congregations and the abolition of all the bishoprics, which constitute an enormous liability on the Nation and on the privileges of the poor;
 Revision of all contracts for military provisions;
 The revision of all military contracts and the seizure of 85 percent of the profits therein.

These early positions reflected in the Manifesto would later be characterized by Mussolini in "The Doctrine of Fascism" as "a series of pointers, forecasts, hints which, when freed from the inevitable matrix of contingencies, were to develop in a few years time into a series of doctrinal positions entitling Fascism to rank as a political doctrine differing from all others, past or present."

The Manifesto in practice 
Of the Manifesto's proposals, the commitment to corporative organisation of economic interests was to be the longest lasting. Far from becoming a medium of extended democracy, parliament became by law an exclusively Fascist-picked body in 1929; being replaced by the "chamber of corporations" a decade later.

Fascism's pacifist foreign policy ceased during its first year of Italian government. In September 1923, the Corfu crisis demonstrated the regime's willingness to use force internationally. Perhaps the greatest success of Fascist diplomacy was the Lateran Treaty of February 1929, which accepted the principle of non-interference in the affairs of the Church. This ended the 59-year-old dispute between Italy and the Papacy.

See also 
 Communist Manifesto
 Manifesto of Futurism
 Constitution of Fiume
 "Manifesto of the Fascist Intellectuals"
 "Manifesto of Race"

References 

1919 in Italy
1919 in politics
1919 documents
Italian fascist works
Manifestos